Tenagodus maoria is a species of sea snail, a marine gastropod mollusc in the family Siliquariidae, common name the slit worm snails.

References

 Powell A. W. B., New Zealand Mollusca, William Collins Publishers Ltd, Auckland, New Zealand 1979

External links
  Spencer H.G., Willan R.C., Marshall B.A. & Murray T.J. (2011) Checklist of the Recent Mollusca Recorded from the New Zealand Exclusive Economic Zone

Siliquariidae
Gastropods of New Zealand
Gastropods described in 1940
Taxa named by Arthur William Baden Powell
Endemic fauna of New Zealand
Endemic molluscs of New Zealand